"Your Eyes Tell" (Japanese:きみの瞳（め）が問いかけている Kimino mega toikaketeiru) is a 2020 Japanese drama romance film, being a remake of the 2011 South Korean film Always. It is directed by Takahiro Miki and written by Yuichi Toyone.

Plot 
A car accident leads to Akari going blind, and in the same accident, she loses her parents. However, she continues life and learns to adapt. She accidentally meets Rui Shinozaki, a former kick boxer, who works in a car park. He is a talented kickboxer, who has a dark past associated with crime, and has chosen to remain distant from society because of it. He returns to the kickboxing world, and starts to train. Meanwhile, they start a relationship, but Rui soon learns that he was connected to the reason that Akari goes blind. He endeavours to make amends, through the kickboxing world, and reconnects with his dark past. Akari's sight has complications, and she needs surgery she cannot afford. Eventually he fights in a match to get the prize money to pay for the operation that will cure her blindness.

Cast 
Yuriko Yoshitaka as Akari Kashiwagi
Ryusei Yokohama as Rui Shinozaki
Kyōsuke Yabe as Jin Harada
Ryōsei Tayama as Chairman Ouchi
Tōru Nomaguchi as Takafumi Ozaki
Yoshinori Okada as Susumu Sakamoto
Eita Okuno as Mitsuru Kuji
Hannya as Kanai
Akane Sakanoue as Keiko Tsunomori
Kanna Moriya as Maiko
Keita Machida as Kyōsuke Sakuma
Jun Fubuki as Mieko Ooura

Production 
The film was shot in Japan. Music was contributed by the band BTS. Production of the film commenced in October 2019.

References

External References 

2020 films
Films about blind people
Films directed by Takahiro Miki
Japanese boxing films
2020s Japanese-language films
Japanese romance films
Romance film remakes
2020 romantic drama films